= Marikatti =

- Village
- Location in Karnataka, India Marikatti (India)
- Coordinates: 16°16′N 75°22′E
- Country: India
- State: Karnataka
- District: Belgaum

Languages
  - Official: Kannada
- Time zone: UTC+5:30 (IST)

Marikatti is a village in Belgaum district of Karnataka, India.
